Macraucheniinae is a extinct subfamily of  macraucheniids that lived from the Late Miocene and potentially the Early Holocene, consisting of all the derived genera.

Classification 
Below is a cladogram proposed by Schmidt et al., (2014), showing the phylogenetic relationships between the genera of macraucheniines:

References 

Macraucheniids
Prehistoric animal subfamilies
Pleistocene mammals of South America
Neogene mammals of South America
Messinian first appearances
Holocene extinctions